The Grand Lodge of Illinois, officially  The Most Worshipful Grand Lodge of Ancient Free and Accepted Masons of the State of Illinois, is the premier masonic organization in the state of Illinois encompassing more than 460 lodges and 57,000 members at the end of 2018.

History 
The first masonic lodge in the state of Illinois was formed in Kaskaskia. The members submitted a petition to the Grand Lodge of Pennsylvania on 1805. 

The Grand Lodge of Illinois was constituted on December 11, 1822 with Shadrach Bond serving as the first Grand Master.

See also 
 Masonic Temple (Chicago) Former Masonic building in Illinois
 Paul Revere Masonic Temple Former Masonic building in Illinois
 Jefferson Masonic Temple Masonic building in Illinois
 List of famous Freemasons
 List of Masonic Grand Lodges United States
 History of Masonic Grand Lodges in North America
 Oriental Lodge # 33 Chicago, IL Established Oct. 9 1845

References 

Grand Lodges
Freemasonry in the United States
1822 establishments in Illinois